Steven Ackroyd (born June 5, 1956) is a former Canadian football safety and wide receiver for the Toronto Argonauts and Hamilton Tiger-Cats of the Canadian Football League. In 1983, he won the 71st Grey Cup with the Argonauts.

Season statistics

References 

1956 births
Canadian football defensive backs
Canadian football wide receivers
Sheridan College alumni
Toronto Argonauts players
Hamilton Tiger-Cats players
Living people